Hetzel may refer to:

Hetzel (surname)
Hetzel, West Virginia
The Hetzel Union Building, the student union building of Pennsylvania State University
The ACCO Brands brand for Office equipment and accessories